Seventh Heaven is a three-level revolving restaurant in the Ostankino TV Tower in Moscow, Russia.

The maximum capacity of each level is up to 80 people. Reservations are required.

Links
Restaurant page and reservations

References

1967 establishments in Russia
Restaurants in Moscow
Tourist attractions in Moscow
Revolving restaurants